A vein is a blood vessel that carries blood toward the heart.

Vein may also refer to:

Science
Vein (botany), vascular tissue in the leaves
Wing vein, a supporting structure in insect wings
Vein (geology), a tabular body of minerals distinct from the surrounding rock
Vein (metallurgy), a casting defect

Art and entertainment
Vein (band), an American hardcore punk band
Vein (Boris album), 2006
Vein (Foetus album), 2007
"Vein", a song by Cannibal Ox from The Cold Vein, 2001
The Vein, a 1928 French silent comedy film
Vein, a demon in The Demonata

People with the surname
Ellen Goldsmith-Vein, American businesswoman and producer
Jon F. Vein, American lawyer and businessman

See also 
Vain (disambiguation)